In December 2018, the final composition of Jair Bolsonaro's cabinet emerged after weeks of announcements and appointments. The cabinet includes 22 personnel, of which 16 are ministers, two are cabinet-level positions and four are secretaries directly linked to the presidency of Brazil. The 22 figure is down from 29 in the outgoing administration. Seven of the ministers will be military men; eight have technocrat profiles; and seven are politicians. Hindustan Times commented that "there are just two women in Bolsonaro’s government, which is double the number in the outgoing lineup under President Michel Temer", and that "there are no blacks, despite half of Brazil’s population being at least partly descended from Africans.


Cabinet

Vice President

Chief of Staff

Minister of Defence

Minister of Foreign Affairs

Minister of the Economy

Minister of Labour and Social Security

Minister of Health

Minister of Education

Minister of Science, Technology and Innovation

Minister of Communications

Minister of Justice and Public Security

Minister of Infrastructure

Minister of Environment

Minister of Agriculture

Minister of Mines and Energy

Minister of Woman, Family and Human Rights

Minister of Citizenship

Secretary of Government

Secretary-General of the Presidency

Secretary of Strategic Affairs of the Presidency

President of the Central Bank

Attorney General of the Union

Controller General of the Union

Other appointments

References

Bolsonaro
Bolsonaro
Jair Bolsonaro
Bolsonaro